Kąśna may refer to the following places in Poland:

Kąśna Dolna
Kąśna Górna